Aulotrachichthys prosthemius, also known as the West Pacific luminous roughy, is a species of slimehead native to the Northern Pacific from Hawaii to Japan.

References

External links
 
 

prosthemius
Fish described in 1902